Joseph Henry Tiller (December 7, 1942 – September 30, 2017) was an American football player and coach.  He was the head coach at the University of Wyoming from 1991 to 1996 and Purdue University from 1997 to 2008, with a career record of    known as one of the innovators of the

Early life and playing career
Born and raised in Toledo, Ohio, Tiller  attended Rogers High School. Upon his high school graduation, he attended Montana State University in Bozeman, where he played football for the Bobcats under head coaches Herb Agocs and Jim Sweeney, and was a member of Delta Sigma Phi fraternity. As a senior  Tiller was named an Honorable Mention All-American and was invited to the East-West Shrine Game.

Tiller was selected in the 1964 AFL draft by the Boston Patriots; he was the 140th pick overall (18th round) but chose to sign with the Calgary Stampeders of the Canadian Football League. After one season in the CFL, he returned to Montana State to begin his coaching career under Sweeney.

Coaching career

Early career
Tiller's first coaching job came in 1964, when he was a student assistant for Montana State. The following year, he was promoted to full-time assistant coach, working with offensive and defensive lineman, as well as an instructor in physical education. Sweeney left after the 1967 season and Tiller was retained by new head coach Tom Parac.

In 1971, Tiller rejoined Sweeney as the defensive line coach at Washington State in Pullman. In 1972, he was promoted to offensive coordinator and offensive line coach. During the 1973 season, he helped Andrew Jones to a season where he ran for 1,059 yards with 9 TD and averaged 96.3 rushing YPG.

In 1974, Tiller returned to the Calgary Stampeders as an assistant coach and spent the next eight seasons in the Calgary organization; he served as the interim head coach for the final six weeks of the 1976 season, posting a  record and the team finished at   He returned to the front office  
 
In 1983, Tiller became defensive coordinator at Purdue under head coach Leon Burtnett.  Guided by junior quarterback Jim Everett, the 1984 team became the first in school history to defeat Notre Dame, Michigan, and Ohio State in the same season.  Finishing  in the regular season, the Boilermakers accepted an invitation to play in the Peach Bowl, where they were defeated by Virginia,   Tiller was let go at the end of the 1986 season when Burtnett resigned.  

Taking over as the offensive coordinator at Wyoming in 1987, where Craig Burnett threw for 3,131 yards with 21 TD vs 16 INT and Gerald Abraham ran for 1,305 yards with 13 TD. In 1988, Randy Welniak threw for 2,791 yards with 21 TD vs 11 INT and ran for 415 yards with 16 TD.  RB Dabby Dawson ran for 1,119 yards and 9 TD as well.

As offensive coordinator in 1989 at Washington State under head coach Mike Price, he helped RB Steve Broussard to 1,237 yards with 13 TD.  Quarterbacks, Aaron Garcia and Brad Gossen combined to throw for 2,963 yards with 20 TD vs 16 INT.  In 1990, quarterbacks Brad Gossen and Drew Bledsoe combined to throw for 2,514 yards with 15 TD vs 7 INT.

Wyoming (1991–1996)
Tiller began his head coaching career at Wyoming in 1991, when he was hired to replace Paul Roach, who was stepping down as football coach but remained as the athletic director. Tiller received a 5-year contract with a base salary of $65,000. During his time as head coach, Tiller lead the Cowboys to a  record and one bowl appearance in six years. His best team was his final season in 1996, which notched a  record  in WAC play winning the Pacific Division), but was left out of a bowl after losing to BYU in the inaugural WAC Championship game—to date, the last team to finish ranked in a major poll and not receive a bowl invitation while eligible. 

He continued to provide stellar quarterback and running back play despite some subpar records during his tenure at Wyoming.
1991: QB Tom Corontzos threw for 2,868 yards with 19 TD vs 8 INT.
1992: RB Dwight Driver ran for 1,027 yards with 11 TD.
1993: QB Joe Hughes threw for 3,135 yards with 24 TD vs 10 INT.  RB Ryan Christopherson ran for 1,014 yards with 9 TD.
1994: QB John Gustin threw for 2,757 yards with 17 TD vs 13 INT.  RB Ryan Christopherson ran for 1,455 yards with 10 TD.
1995: QB Josh Wallwork threw for 2,363 yards with 21 TD vs 13 INT.  WR Marcus Harris had 1,423 yards with 14 TD.
1996: QB Josh Wallwork threw for 4,090 yards with 33 TD vs 15 INT.  WR Marcus Harris had 109 catches for 1,650 yards with 13 TD.

Purdue (1997–2008)
On the strength of his final season at Wyoming, Tiller was hired by Purdue University in 1997. Tiller inherited a program that had only had five winning seasons in the previous 18 years. However, the Boilermakers made an immediate splash in the second game of his rookie season with a nationally televised upset of Notre Dame. Tiller led the Boilermakers to ten bowl berths in twelve years, most notably the 2001 Rose Bowl—their first major-bowl appearance since the Bob Griese-led Boilermakers went to the 1967 Rose Bowl, and only the second major-bowl appearance in school history. The 2000 season also saw the Boilers' first Big Ten title in 33 years.

Prior to Tiller's tenure as head coach, Purdue had played in only five bowl games, most recently in 1984 when he was the defensive coordinator.  In 2008 against Central Michigan, Tiller won his 85th game at Purdue to become the winningest coach in school history, topping the previous mark set by Jack Mollenkopf (1956–1969). Tiller's "basketball on grass" offense, originated by legendary high school coach Jack Neumeier, and learned from Tiller's coaching colleagues Jack Elway and Dennis Erickson, was well renowned for its ability to score and score effectively, befuddling opposing defenses. This was especially the case when quarterback Drew Brees led the team from 1997 to 2000. His Purdue squads were shut out only once, by Penn State, in a 12–0 defeat at Ross–Ade Stadium on October 28, 2006.

Tiller retired following the 2008 season and was succeeded by former Eastern Kentucky University head coach Danny Hope. In his final game as a head coach, the Purdue Boilermakers beat their in-state rival Indiana Hoosiers in their traditional season-ending Old Oaken Bucket Game by a score of 62 to 10 at Ross–Ade Stadium.

Tiller was the first coach to use the spread offense in the Big Ten Conference, although many others have since brought their own version of the spread, including Jim Tressel at Ohio State, Randy Walker at Northwestern, Rich Rodriguez at Michigan, and Ron Zook at Illinois. Under Tiller and his spread offense, Purdue annually had one of the top offenses in the Big Ten.

Death 
Tiller died at his home in Buffalo, Wyoming, on September 30, 2017, at the age of 74, after battling recent health issues. Numerous tributes were made to Tiller following his passing by former players, fellow coaches, and former teams that he led.

Head coaching record

College

CFL

References

External links
 Obituary

1942 births
2017 deaths
American football offensive linemen
American players of Canadian football
Calgary Stampeders coaches
Calgary Stampeders players
Montana State Bobcats football coaches
Montana State Bobcats football players
Purdue Boilermakers football coaches
Washington State Cougars football coaches
Wyoming Cowboys football coaches
Sportspeople from Toledo, Ohio
People from Buffalo, Wyoming